The Commandant, also known as Il comandante, is a 1963 Italian comedy-drama film directed by Paolo Heusch.

Plot summary 
Colonel Antonio Cavalli (Toto), promoted to general, after many years spent fighting in the army and commanding Italian Army troops in the Great War and the Second World War, is sent into retirement. But he, accustomed to the command of everything and everyone, cannot get used to quiet family life.  He decides to work in an office. When Antonio discovers that his wife (Andreina Pagnani) is secretly paying his salary, this depresses him even more. Eventually two crooks involve him in a real estate ripoff, using his reputation they get him to him sign off on several frauds and scams, which threaten to send him to jail and compromises his high honor as an Italian Army General. On the brink of prison, the general attempts suicide, but once again his wife gets him out of the mess ...

Cast 
 Totò: Gen. Antonio Cavalli
 Andreina Pagnani: Francesca Cavalli 
 Franco Fabrizi: Sandrelli
 Britt Ekland: Iris
 Carlotta Barilli: Luisa
 Luciano Marin: Franco Cavalli 
 Linda Sini: La contessa
 Mario Castellani: Capitano Castelletti

References

External links

1963 films
Films directed by Paolo Heusch
Films scored by Piero Umiliani
Italian comedy-drama films
1963 comedy-drama films
Films set in Rome
Films shot in Rome
1960s Italian films